José Daniel Lacalle Larraga (21 February 1897 – 21 July 1981) was a Spanish general who served as Minister of the Air of Spain between 1962 and 1969, during the Francoist dictatorship.

References

1897 births
1981 deaths
Defence ministers of Spain
Government ministers during the Francoist dictatorship